"19 de Noviembre" ("November 19th") is a song performed by Colombian singer-songwriter Olvidemonos for his seventh studio album El Amor de Mi Tierra (1999). It was written by the singer, Emilio Estefan and Angie Chirino. EMI Latin released the song as the third single from the record.

Charts

References

1999 songs
2000 singles
Carlos Vives songs
Songs written by Carlos Vives
Songs written by Emilio Estefan
EMI Latin singles
Spanish-language songs